John Henry is a 1994 children's picture book by Julius Lester and illustrated by Jerry Pinkney. It is about the American legendary figure John Henry. In 1998, a 19-minute film adaptation of the book was narrated by Samuel L. Jackson and released by Weston Woods Studios.

Reception
The Horn Book Magazine, in a review of John Henry, wrote "The original legend of John Henry .. has been enhanced and enriched, in Lester's retelling, with wonderful contemporary details and poetic similes that add humor, beauty, and strength." and called the book's illustrations "little short of magnificent." Booklist wrote "Like Lester's great collections of the Uncle Remus tales, also illustrated by Pinkney, the story is told with rhythm and wit, humor and exaggeration, and with a heart-catching immediacy that connects the human and the natural world."

Publishers Weekly gave a starred review finding it an "epic retelling" and concluded "This may not supplant more traditional retellings, such as Terry Small's The Legend of John Henry, but it is a triumph of collaboration from the creators of the noted Uncle Remus retellings." 

John Henry has also been reviewed by Kirkus Reviews, School Library Journal, Book Links, Teacher Librarian, and Library Talk.

Awards
1994 Parents' Choice Award - Gold Award
1995 Boston Globe–Horn Picture Book Award - winner
1995 Caldecott Medal - honor

References

External links
Library holdings of John Henry

1994 children's books
American picture books
Picture books by Jerry Pinkney
Works based on folklore
Dial Press books
Children's books adapted into films